Fuxi or Fu Hsi (伏羲 ~ 伏犧 ~ 伏戲) is a culture hero in Chinese legend and mythology, credited along with his sister and wife Nüwa with creating humanity and the invention of music, hunting, fishing, domestication, and cooking as well as the Cangjie system of writing Chinese characters around 2,000BC. Fuxi was counted as the first of the Three Sovereigns at the beginning of the Chinese dynastic period.

Origin
Pangu was said to be the creation god in Chinese mythology. He was a giant sleeping within an egg of chaos. As he awoke, he stood up and divided the sky and the earth. Pangu then died after standing up, and his body turned into rivers, mountains, plants, animals, and everything else in the world, among which is a powerful being known as Huaxu (華胥). Huaxu gave birth to a twin brother and sister, Fuxi and Nüwa. Fuxi and Nüwa are said to be creatures that have faces of human and bodies of snakes.

Fuxi was known as the "original god", and he was said to have been born in the lower-middle reaches of the Yellow River in a place called Chengji (成紀) (possibly modern Lantian, Shaanxi province, or Tianshui, Gansu province).

A possible historical interpretation of the myth is that Huaxu (Fuxi's mother) was a leader during the matriarchal society (BC) as early Chinese developed language skill while Fuxi and Nüwa were leaders in the early patriarchal society (BC) while Chinese began the marriage rituals.

A divinity Taihao appears, vaguely, in sources before the Han dynasty, independent from Fuxi. Later, Fuxi is identified with Taihao, the latter being his courtesy or formal name.

Creation legend
According to the Classic of Mountains and Seas, Fuxi and Nüwa were the original humans who lived on the mythological Kunlun Mountain (today's Huashan). One day they set up two separated piles of fire, and the fire eventually became one. Under the fire, they decided to become husband and wife. Fuxi and Nüwa used clay to create offspring, and with the divine power they made the clay figures come alive. These clay figures were the earliest human beings. Fuxi and Nüwa were usually recognized by Chinese as two of the Three Sovereigns in the early patriarchal society in China (BC), based on the myth about Fuxi establishing marriage ritual in his tribe. The creation of human beings was a symbolic story of having a larger family structure that included the figure of a father.

Social importance
On one of the columns of the Fuxi Temple in Gansu Province, the following couplet describes Fuxi's importance: "Among the three primogenitors of Huaxia civilization, Fu Xi in Huaiyang Country ranks first." During the time of his predecessor Nüwa, society was matriarchal.

Fuxi taught his subjects to cook, to fish with nets, and to hunt with weapons made of bone, wood, or bamboo. He instituted marriage and offered the first open-air sacrifices to heaven. A stone tablet, dated AD 160, shows Fuxi with Nüwa.

Traditionally, Fuxi is considered the originator of the I Ching, which work is attributed to his reading of the He Map (or the Yellow River Map). According to this tradition, Fuxi had the arrangement of the trigrams of the I Ching revealed to him in the markings on the back of a mythical dragon horse (sometimes said to be a tortoise) that emerged from the Luo River. This arrangement precedes the compilation of the I Ching during the Zhou dynasty. This discovery is said to have been the origin of calligraphy. Fuxi is also credited with the invention of the Guqin musical instrument, though credit for this is also given to Shennong and Yellow Emperor.

The Figurists viewed Fuxi as Enoch, the Biblical patriarch.

Death

Fuxi is said to have lived for 197 years altogether and died at a place called Chen (modern Huaiyang, Henan), where a monument to him can still be found and visited as a tourist attraction.

Gallery

See also

Snakes in Chinese mythology

Notes

References

External links 
 
 

|-

Three Sovereigns and Five Emperors
Chinese gods
Mythological human hybrids
Snake gods
Creator gods
Hunting gods
Deities in Chinese folk religion
Incest in mythology